is a Japanese actress, model, singer and occasional radio show host. She has been selected several times as the most desired girlfriend and the most desired female celebrity face in Oricon's yearly survey.

Early life
She was born on June 11, 1988, in Naha, Okinawa. She is the youngest among her two siblings.  After seeing an audition notice for the junior fashion magazine , she applied for it and won the Grand Prix award for the audition. In 2001, at the age of 13, she began her Nicola modelling career and was very well received as a Nicola model, having set a record for appearing on cover for 15 times. One of her co-models, actress Enomoto Ayako, gave her the nickname 'Gakky' as a take on her surname. She moved to Tokyo at 15 and enrolled at Horikoshi High School famous for being the academic base of many famous celebrities including Seiko Matsuda. She made her acting debut in Shibuya in 2005. She also became quite popular as in the Pocky commercials. She also expanded into voice acting in 2006 as well as movies as of 2007. Other sources report that the abysmal reactions to her vocals lead to stress. She has continued acting for the small and big screen since, however, and released more music. She also became a host for the radio program Girls Locks which lasted between 2010 and 2012.

At the age of 15, Aragaki moved to Tokyo and enrolled in Horikoshi High School, a private high school popular for being attended by many Japanese celebrities. In 2004, she decided to put her Nicola career on hold and expand her career path into gravure and acting, and she also appeared in variety shows and commercials, with her Pocky commercials being the most popular. A year later, she officially graduated from Nicola. Even so, she still appears in the magazine occasionally.

Career
In 2005, Aragaki took up a role in the TBS drama, Dragon Zakura, starring alongside Japanese idols like Tomohisa Yamashita and Masami Nagasawa. This marked a breakthrough in her acting career. Since then, she has been cast in many other dramas, like My Boss, My Hero and Gal Circle. She also starred in the 2007 tragic love story movie hit Koizora, for which she won her first award, the Nikkan Sports Film Award for Best Newcomer. Currently, she has 5 newcomer awards.

Aragaki won the Film prize at the 45th Golden Arrow Awards in 2008. Her tremendous number of movie shoots as well as the preparation for her debut album resulted in her suffering from work-related stress in 2007. She was invited as a judge in 58th NHK Kōhaku Uta Gassen.

Outside acting she also released her first album, Sora, and the single "Heavenly Days", a song from Koizora. "Memories", the theme song for Tokyo Serendipity, was included in her debut album. She also performed at Budokan.

She was also the co-hosts for popular radio program Girls Locks in 2010–2012. She also invited as a host of 54th Japan Record Awards.

In 2012–2013, She acted with Masato Sakai in comedy hit Legal High.

In 2014, she tried the role of mother for her first time in film Twilight Sasarasaya.

In 2016, she acted an ideal wife in The Full-Time Wife Escapist, raised a social topic in Japan. She also performed in "koi dance" as ending of the drama, become viral in Japan. She was invited as a judge again in 67th NHK Kōhaku Uta Gassen.

In 2017, Aragaki Yui acted as Masako Matsushita in Kizuna : hashire kiseki no kouma also known as Ties: A Miraculous Colt. It was broadcast on NHK, and the story is about she raising the little ponies after the earthquake with her father. During the same year in July, Code Blue Season 3 that she had participated in has finally released after 7 years broadcasting the second season. In October, Aragaaki Yui played as Tamako Tomita in Mixed Doubles directed by Junichi Ishikawa.

Aragaki Yui won the best actress reward at the 60th Blue Ribbon Awards.

In 2018, Aragaki Yui acted as Shinkai Akira in Kemono ni Narenai Watashitachi (We Can Not Become Beasts, Weakest Beast). She also participated in the Code Blue the Movie that is released in July.

Personal life
In 2021, Aragaki married singer, songwriter and actor Gen Hoshino, her co-star in the television series The Full-Time Wife Escapist.

Filmography

Film

Television dramas

Voice acting

Documentary

Discography

Singles

Download Only Single

Albums

Tie-in

Awards and nominations

Commercials
 Daio Paper – Elleair (2003)
 Seika – Meiji (2014 Dec – 2015 Feb)
 Senoby – JT Beverage (2005 Mar – 2006 Feb)
 NTT East (2005 Dec-2013 Dec)
 Pantene – Procter & Gamble (2006–2014)
 Dailies Aqua – Ciba Vision (2006)
 Pocky – Glico (2006–2008)
 Townwork – Recruit (2006–current)
 Japanese Red Cross (2007 January – 2007 December)
 Uniqlo – SKINNY MIX"キャンペーン (2007 February – 2007 April)
 Mitsuya Cider – Asahi Soft Drinks (2007 March -)
 ROHTO Pharmaceutical Co., Ltd. (2008 March – 2010 February 2014 April – Current)
 Green Tea – Asahi Soft Drinks (2009–current)
 Sony Walkman S Series (2009 Oct – 2010 Sep)
 Tokyo Metro – Tokyoheart (2010 Apr – 2011 Mar)
 Haruyama Trading Co.,Ltd. – (2010 February – 2012 January)
 Toyota – Ractis (2010 November – 2011 October)
 Meiji – Chocolate Almonds (2011 April – current)
 Meiji – Meltykiss (2011 October – current)
 DeNA – Mobage (2011 November – 2012 October)
 KOSÉ- Sekkisei (2012 July -current) 
 DeNA – Final Fantasy (2012 July- 2012 October)
 Canon – EOS (Mirrorless single-lens camera) (2012 July – 2014 July)
 Canon – IXY PowerShot (Compact digital camera) (2013 February- 2014 February)
 Canon – EOS kiss X7 (Single-lens reflex camera) (2013 November- 2014 February)
 KOSÉ- ESPRIQUE (2014 November – 2015 February)
 GMO CLICK Securities, Inc -(2015 January – Current)
 Meiji – Valentine Special (2016 February)
 Uniqlo (2017)
 NIPPON PAPER CRECIA Co., LTD. – Kleenex (2017 April – current)
 Uniqlo – ドレープコレクション (2017 March – Current)
 Toyota – Noah (2017 July – Current)
 H&M – (2021)
 Nintendo – (2022)

Official photobooks
 Chura Chura (2006)
 A Happy New Gakky (2006)
 Masshiro (2007)
 Koisuru Madori (2007)
 Gekkan Yui Aragaki Special (2010)
 Hanamizuki Official Photostory Book (2010)

Calendar
Aragaki Yui Official 2005 Calendar (Release on December 10, 2004: Triax (Hagoromo))
Aragaki Yui Official 2006 Calendar (Release on November 7, 2005: Triax (Hagoromo))
Aragaki Yui Official 2007 Calendar (Release on November 4, 2006: Triax (Hagoromo))
Aragaki Yui Official 2008 Calendar (Release on October 22, 2007: Triax (Hagoromo))
Aragaki Yui Official 2009 Calendar (Release on October 27, 2008: Triax (Hagoromo))
Aragaki Yui Official 2010 Calendar (Release on October 28, 2009: Triax (Hagoromo))
Aragaki Yui Official 2011 Calendar (Release on October 13, 2010: LesPro)
Aragaki Yui Official 2012 Calendar (Release on October 26, 2011: LesPro)
Aragaki Yui Official 2013 Calendar (Release on October 6, 2012: LesPro)
Aragaki Yui Official 2014 Calendar (Release on November 2, 2013: LesPro)
Aragaki Yui Official 2015 Calendar (Release on November 8, 2014: LesPro)
Aragaki Yui Official 2016 Calendar (Release on November 7, 2015: LesPro)
Aragaki Yui Official 2017 Calendar (Release on November 12, 2016: LesPro)
Aragaki Yui Official 2018 Calendar (Release on September 1, 2017: LesPro)

See also

References

External links

 
 Official Site – LesPros Entertainment Company 
 Official Site – Warner Music Japan 
 ARAGAKI YUI on OneDream
 

Japanese female models
Japanese women pop singers
People from Naha
1988 births
Living people
Horikoshi High School alumni
Warner Music Japan artists
Musicians from Okinawa Prefecture
21st-century Japanese women singers
21st-century Japanese singers
21st-century Japanese actresses